was a Japanese baseball player and manager, known for his red bat, and his nickname .

He was a professional player for 18 years, winning the batting title five times, two home run crowns, three RBI titles, and had six titles for the most hits in a season. He was the MVP of the 1953 Japan Series. He was the first player in Japanese pro baseball to achieve 2,000 hits and was named the league's MVP three times. As manager of the Yomiuri Giants from 1961 to 1974, he led the Giants to nine consecutive championships.

Kawakami was inducted into the Japanese Baseball Hall of Fame in 1965.

Biography

Player 
Born in Hitoyoshi, Kumamoto, he played for Kumamoto Tech (Kumamoto) in the 1937 Summer Kōshien. Kumamoto advanced to the championship game, but lost. After the game, Kawakami grabbed a handful of dirt from the playing field of Kōshien Stadium and put it in his uniform pocket as a memento. This became known as the original scooping of "the dirt of Kōshien" (甲子園の土 Kōshien no tsuchi?). Since then, as a memento of their fleeting time on the hallowed grounds of Kōshien, players from the losing teams take home a pouch of the precious soil.

Kawakami played for Tokyo Kyojin/Yomiuri Giants between 1938 and 1958 (though he missed the years 1943–1945 when he served in the Japanese military). Kawakami signed with the Giants as a pitcher/first baseman, and actually pitched in 39 games between 1938 and 1941, compiling 11 wins against 9 losses, with an excellent 2.61 ERA. He converted full-time to first base in 1942.

In 1951, he struck out only 6 times, which is the Japanese single-season tie record. In 1954, Kawakami hit the first cycle in Yomiuri Giants' franchise history.

Manager 
As manager of the Giants from 1961 to 1974, he was known for his ruthless, tough-love style, but he led the Yomiuri Giants to nine consecutive championships.

Filmography 
Tetsuharu Kawakami appeared in three films:
 人生選手 (1949)
 川上哲治物語　背番号１６ Kawakami Tetsuharu monogatari sebangō 16 (1957) — a bio-pic where he played himself
 ＢＩＧ−１物語　王貞治 (1977)

In addition, Kawakami is referred to by name in the baseball game scene from film director Akira Kurosawa's Stray Dog (1949); a.k.a. Nora Inu.

References

External links

 Career statistics and player information from Baseball-Reference

1920 births
2013 deaths
Nippon Professional Baseball MVP Award winners
Baseball people from Kumamoto Prefecture
People from Hitoyoshi, Kumamoto
People from Inagi, Tokyo
Japanese Baseball Hall of Fame inductees
Japanese baseball players
Managers of baseball teams in Japan
Yomiuri Giants players
Yomiuri Giants managers